"Not Gon' Cry" is a 1996 song by American R&B singer Mary J. Blige, from the soundtrack to the film Waiting to Exhale; the song is also featured on Blige's third album, Share My World (1997). It was written and produced by Babyface and became a major hit for Blige in the United States, where it peaked at numbers one and two on the Billboard Hot R&B Singles and Hot 100 charts, respectively. The single sold 1,000,000 copies domestically and was certified platinum by the Recording Industry Association of America.

Blige received her third Grammy Award nomination for Best Female R&B Vocal Performance (her first nomination in that category) at the 39th Grammy Awards in 1997 for the song. Coincidentally, other songs on that were later released as singles from the soundtrack ("Exhale" by Whitney Houston and "Sittin' Up in My Room" by Brandy) also received nominations in the same category. Blige performed the song at the 39th Grammy Awards telecast.

Background
The lyrics of the song are inspired by a storyline in the movie Waiting to Exhale revolving around one of the films main characters, Bernadine (portrayed by actress Angela Bassett), who gets abandoned by her philandering husband.  The music video, which incorporates clips from Waiting to Exhale, was directed by Wayne Maser and Elizabeth Bailey.

The song was later sampled in 2004 by rapper The Game for his own song "Don't Need Your Love" from his album The Documentary. In 2009, R&B singer Monica covered the song at "The BET Honors 2009" as dedication to Blige, who was one of the honorees at the program.

It was again sampled by Bryson Tiller in his 2020 single "Exhale".

Critical reception
Larry Flick from Billboard felt "Not Gon' Cry" is "one of the strongest numbers" of the Waiting To Exhale soundtrack and "is finally given a crack at chart success." He added "Blige's worldly delivery breathes palpable depth and empathy into Babyface's composition tracing the bitter split of a relationship. She convincingly builds from white-knuckled anger to cathartic resolution in the space of four minutes, riding a slowly grinding R&B groove etched with quiet blues colors. Judging from the sparks ignited here, the pairing of Blige and Babyface is one that needs to happen again and again." Jonathan Bernstein from Entertainment Weekly described the song as "snarling". British magazine Music Week rated it three out of five, declaring it as a "slow, steel-tipped ballad". They added, "Good, if not memorable." A reviewer from People Magazine viewed it as Waiting to Exhale’s "jilted woman’s manifesto".

Charts and certifications

Weekly charts

Year-end charts

Certifications

See also
List of number-one R&B singles of 1996 (U.S.)

References

1990s ballads
1995 singles
1995 songs
1996 singles
Contemporary R&B ballads
Mary J. Blige songs
Song recordings produced by Babyface (musician)
Songs about infidelity
Songs written by Babyface (musician)
Songs written for films
Soul ballads